Kalathomyrmex is a genus of ant in the subfamily Myrmicinae containing the single species Kalathomyrmex emeryi. First described as Myrmicocrypta emeryi by Forel in 1907, the species was most recently moved to its current genus by Klingenberg and Brandao in 2009.

References

External links

Myrmicinae
Monotypic ant genera